Jack & Daniel is a 2019 Indian Malayalam-language action-thriller heist film written and directed by S.L. Puram Jayasurya. The film was produced by Shibu Thameens through Thameens Films. The film stars Dileep, Arjun Sarja alongside Anju Kurian, Saiju Kurup, Ashokan, Innocent, Janardhanan, Devan, Riyaz Khan and Suresh Krishna in supporting roles. Shaan Rahman and Gopi Sundar composed the film's soundtrack and score. The film received positive reviews from critics and mixed reviews from audiences.

The film was theatrically released on 15 November 2019. The film was also dubbed and released in Hindi on YouTube by Goldmines Telefilms on 18 May 2019. The Hindi dubbed version crossed more than  100 million views on YouTube.

Plot

The film begins with the introduction of Daniel Alexander IPS. He is tasked by Kerala home minister Koyapparamban and the Chief Minister to capture a thief named Jackson 'Jack' Mathew who steals black money and leaves no evidence behind. Jack has robbed 14 times that month and stole around 1780 crores. Daniel accepts the case and finds out that Jack recently robbed a ISBC Bank. Daniel checks CCTV visuals and realizes that as media was taking coverage of the ISBC bank incident, one man went to the bathroom with a bag which was empty but the man came out with a full bag. Daniel suspects that the man is Jack who disguised himself as a cameraman. Daniel almost sees Jack's face through CCTV but he is overlapped by people.

Daniel goes to the place where Jack had parked his car (when he robbed the bank) with two police officers SI Hari and DYSP Philipose. Daniel uses the CCTV of a shopping mall nearby and figures out that Jack isn't working alone. Jack accidentally shows his face to the CCTV after a bird runs into him. Daniel then sees Jack's face. Daniel then gets more information of Jack and the various business's he runs. Philipose, Hari and other officers pose as Income tax officers and launch a raid in Jack's house to get proof that Jack is the thief. They search for a while but find nothing. Jack's accomplice RK Nair, suspects that the raid was not an accident and sends Jack to Goa.

At the airport, Jack meets Sushmita and falls in love with her. They go to a chess competition where Jack registers Sushmita. Sushmita follows Jack's instructions and wins the chess competition winning the price money of 50 thousand rupees. But the chess host and his gang threatens to kill Sushmita unless Jack gives the price money to them. Jack thrashes them and they both leave. Unknown to them, Philipose who had been following Jack had taken a video of the fight. Philipose shows this video to Daniel and judging by Jack's fighting skills, Daniel concludes that Jack is a trained fighter. Hari follows Jack and Sushmita as they go to Jack's house. There, Jack tells Sushmita that a black money transaction will happen at a hotel tomorrow and that the receiver of the money is Koyapparamban. Jack makes a bet with Sushmita. Jack tells Sushmita that she can tell this information to anyone she wants and try to thwart Koyapparamban's plan. Sushmita who saw Hari follow them tells Hari about this.

Hari tells Philipose about this who tells Daniel. Daniel realizes that Jack will be there to steal the money so he and his team plan on how to arrest Jack. Following the plan, Philipose and Hari follow Jack. Daniel sees Koyapparamban shift the money in another car which drives in another direction. Daniel tells Philipose and Hari to follow the other car but they keep on following Jack instead. Daniel follows the other car and true to his hunch Jack riding a bike follows the other car. Jack steals the money and escapes but Daniel crashes his car against Jack's bike. Jack temporarily subdues Daniel and rides away. Daniel chases after the bike but multiple people arrive in bikes, all of whom look similar to Jack. Daniel tells Hari and Philipose to catch Jack but they get confused by whom the real Jack is, allowing Jack to escape with the money.

Jack dresses up as a woman and tricks Philipose, stealing jewelry from a shop. Sushmita develops feelings for Jack and later she sees Jack buying flowers. She follows him and sees him at a soldier's funeral. Sushmita is revealed to be a police officer. Daniel who searched Jack's history tells Sushmita that Jack is a Ex- NSG Commando. His brother was also a NSG Commando. Daniel meets Jack at a Church and they tell each other the information they know about each other. When Sushmita tells Jack that she saw him at the funeral Jack gets emotional and tells Sushmita about his backstory. During the time when Jack was an NSG commando, he and his brother, Jerald Matthew go on a mission together. But Jerald is killed. His wife suicides via poison. Jerald's 2 children are sent to boarding school. It is revealed that Jack steals money for them. Sushmita and Jack go for a holiday to a resort. Sushmita informs Daniel of where they are. Unknown to Sushmita, Jack plans on stealing a bank which is across the street from the resort. Sushmita later figures this out and tells Daniel. The bank is also where Koyapparamban and the chief minister plans a black money transaction. Jack tells Sushmita that he knew that she was a police officer from the beginning and he was just playing along.

The next day, Jack dresses as a guard to rob the bank. Sushmita sees this and tells Daniel. Daniel and his team get ready to arrest Jack but he escapes. Jack kills the CCTV operative and cuts the connection of the building. He steals a necklace and Sushmita comes to the bank and tries to arrest him but Jack puts handcuffs on Sushmita's hand and runs. Daniel arrives and chases after Jack with the help of fellow police officers including Philipose and Hari. Jack loses the other officers. Daniel and Jack reach the helicopter landing area of a building and fight each other. They fight equally until Jack jumps from the building and crashes through a window. In the room is Koyapparamban and the Chief minister with the black money. Daniel lands after Jack ready to attack him but after seeing the black money, Jack and Daniel team up and arrests both of them. Jack escapes with some of the black money. Daniel visits Jack and gives him a location to Punjab indicating that Daniel is a thief now. In the end, both leave for Punjab.

Cast

Soundtrack 

The music is composed by Shaan Rahman and Gopi Sundar. The lyrics are written by BK Harinarayanan. The promo song "Evide Thirayum" was released on 9 November 2019, sung by George Peter and composed by Gopi Sundar. The other two songs "Ee Vazhi" and "Aarambambo" were composed by Shaan Rahman.

Release 
Jack & Daniel was released in India on 15 November 2019 along with Helen.

References

External links 
 

2010s Malayalam-language films
2019 action thriller films
2019 films
Indian action thriller films
Indian heist films